Bernhard Nooni (born 10 February 1909 Rannamõisa, Harku Parish, Harju County, Estonia) was an Estonian footballer who played for Tallinna JK as a Goalkeeper (association football) He made one appearance for the Estonia national football team in 1933.

References

External links
 
 

1909 births
1997 deaths
People from Harku Parish
People from Kreis Harrien
Estonian footballers
Estonian men's basketball players
Olympic basketball players of Estonia
Basketball players at the 1936 Summer Olympics
Estonia international footballers
Association football goalkeepers